The Joubin Islands are a group of small islands lying  south-west of Cape Monaco, Anvers Island, at the south-western end of the Palmer Archipelago of Antarctica. The islands were discovered by the French Antarctic Expedition, 1903–05, under Jean-Baptiste Charcot, and named by him for Louis Joubin, the French naturalist.  They have been designated a Restricted Zone under ASMA 7 — Southwest Anvers Island and Palmer Basin — which includes the marine area extending  from the shorelines.

Environment
The islands share a volcanic and granitic geological origin with Anvers Island. Their vegetation, which is typical of the region, consists of a variety of mosses, lichens and algae, as well as the flowering plants Antarctic Hairgrass and Antarctic Pearlwort.

Important Bird Area
The islands have been identified as an Important Bird Area (IBA) by BirdLife International because they support a breeding colony of about 250 pairs of imperial shags.  Other birds nesting on the islands include Adélie, gentoo and chinstrap penguins as well as southern giant petrels.

See also 
 List of Antarctic and subantarctic islands

References

Islands of the Palmer Archipelago
Important Bird Areas of Antarctica
Seabird colonies
Penguin colonies